Espadaña is a sparsely populated village and municipality in the province of Salamanca,  western Spain, part of the autonomous community of Castile-Leon. The name of the town originated in espadaña, a certain architectural element common in small churches throughout the Iberian Peninsula.

Geography

See also
List of municipalities in Salamanca

References

Municipalities in the Province of Salamanca